Puccoon  is a common name that refers to any of several plants formerly used by certain Native Americans for dyes.  The dyes were made from the plants' roots.

The name is derived from the Powhatan word poughkone ("red dye").

Types
Puccoon - Lithospermum ruderale
Hoary puccoon - Lithospermum canescens
Narrow-leaved puccoon, fringed puccoon - Lithospermum incisum
Golden puccoon - Lithospermum caroliniense
Hairy puccoon - Lithospermum carolinense var. croceum
Red puccoon root, Canada puccoon - Sanguinaria canadensis
Yellow puccoon  - Hydrastis canadensis (also called goldenseal)

See also
Pokeweed
List of English words from indigenous languages of the Americas#Words from Algonquian languages

References

External links

Dyes
Native American culture
Plant dyes